The 2009–10 season Pakistan Premier League was the 6th season of Pakistan Premier League and 55th season of Pakistan football league. A total of 14 teams competed in the league, with Khan Research Laboratories unseating the two-time defending champions WAPDA. The league started on 25 July and ended on 13 December.

The race for the title went to the final day of the season with Khan Research Laboratoires and Pakistan Army tied on 57 points. Khan Research Laboratories won their final game defeating Pakistan Airlines 1–0, which meant Pakistan Army has to defeat Karachi Port Trust by at least the 11 goals to win the league. Pakistan Army defeated Karachi Port Trust 2–1, tying both teams on 60 points although Khan Research Laboratories won the league on goal difference, as Khan Research Laboratories finished the season with 10 goals ahead of Pakistan Army; Khan Research Laboratories finished with goal difference of +32 as compared to Pakistan Army's +22. It was the first time a team other than Army or WAPDA won the league since its inception in 2004. PMC Club Athletico Faisalabad and Baloch Nushki faced relegation after finishing in bottom two.

Format
Teams play each other on a home and away basis

The winners will represent Pakistan at the 2010 AFC President's Cup. The bottom two teams were expected to have been relegated to the Pakistan Football Federation League, but the league was expanded at the end of the season and the bottom two teams survived relegation. Two teams will be promoted to the PPL.

Teams
Pakistan Steel and PTV were relegated to 2009-10 Pakistan Football Federation League after finishing at bottom two in 2008-09 Pakistan Premier League. The two relegated teams were replaced by Baloch Nushki who won the Pakistan Football Federation League and Pakistan Airforce who came second to Baloch Nushki.

The league comprised five teams from Karachi (Habib Bank Limited, K-Electric, Karachi Port Trust, National Bank and Pakistan Airlines; two from Lahore (Pak Elektron Limited and WAPDA);  two from Islamabad (Army and Airforce, two from Rawalpindi (Navy and Khan Research Laboratories), one from Faisalabad (PMC Athletico), one from Nushki (Baloch Nushki) and one from Chaman (Afghan Chaman).

Location and stadia

League table

Fixtures and results

Statistics

Scoring
 First goal of the season: Qadeer Khan for Habib Bank against National Bank (25 July 2009).
 Last goal of the season: Muhammad Imran for Pakistan Army against Karachi Port Trust (13 December 2009).
 Fastest goal of the season: 5 minutes – Arif Mehmood for WAPDA against Pakistan Army (9 November 2009).

Top goalscorers

Hat-tricks

Awards

References

External links
Pakistan Football Federation

Pakistan Premier League seasons
1
Pakistan